Avenirka may refer to:
Avenirka, a diminutive of the Russian male first name Avenir
Avenirka, a diminutive of the Russian female first name Avenira